Aurora FC may refer to:

 Aurora F.C., a Guatemalan football team
 Aurora FC, a Canadian soccer team

See also
 FBC Aurora, a Peruvian football team
 Club Aurora, a Bolivian football team